Alqueria or Alcaria may refer to:

 Alqueria, type of Muslim village in Southern Spain
 L'Alqueria de la Comtessa/Alquería de la Condesa, Valencia, Spain
 L'Alqueria d'Asnar/Alquería de Aznar, Alicante, Spain
 Alquería (company), a Colombian dairy company